The Blue Chip Conference is a high school athletic conference in southwestern Indiana, United States. The conference's members are small A or AA high schools located in Daviess, Dubois, Gibson, Knox, and Martin counties. The BCC was founded in 1968, with Barr-Reeve, Bloomfield, Loogootee, North Daviess, North Knox, South Knox, and Springs Valley. Barr-Reeve had to wait until 1969 to be released from the Patoka Valley Conference to play in the league, and Loogootee also had to wait until 1970 to leave the Southwestern Indiana Conference. The conference grew to 11 schools in the mid-1970s, but for the most part has stabilized at nine schools since then with the only exception being the 6 year period between the addition of Wood Memorial in 2000 and loss of Forest Park in 2006 where the count was at 10.

Member schools

 North Knox is a member of the Southwest Football Conference for football.
 North Knox played in the Western Indiana Conference 1977-81, then played independently from 1981 to 1986 before rejoining the BCC.
 Shoals played concurrently in the BCC and SWIAC from 1977 to 1979.

Former members

 Bloomfield played concurrently in the BCC and SWIAC for its entire BCC duration.

Membership timeline

Conference Championships

Football 

 Football was discontinued as a conference sport after the 1977-78 school year. Mitchell and Springs Valley would move to the Patoka Lake Conference one year later, and North Daviess would be an independent until joining the Southwest Seven Conference.

Boys Basketball 

 Champions before 1993-94 season unverified.

Girls Basketball 

 Champions before 2000-01 season unverified.

State titles

Barr-Reeve Vikings (3)
 2013 Volleyball (A)
 2015 Boys Basketball (A)
 2018 Girls Volleyball (A)
 2020 Girls Volleyball (AA)
 2021 Boys Basketball (A)

Loogootee Lions (2)
 2012 Boys Basketball (A)
 2020 Girls Basketball (A)

North Knox Warriors (0)

Northeast Dubois Jeeps (0)

Shoals Jug Rox (0)

South Knox Spartans (0)

Vincennes Rivet Patriots (0)
1A Girls Basketball (2011)

Washington Catholic Cardinals (0)

Wood Memorial Trojans (1)
 2017 Girls Basketball (A)

Runner-Up Titles, and State Finals Appearances

Barr-Reeve Vikings
1998 Boys Baseball   (A)
1998 Girls Volleyball(A)
2001 Girls Volleyball(A)
2002 Boys Basketball (A)
2007 Boys Basketball (A)
2008 Girls Volleyball(A)
2009 Girls Volleyball(A)
2010 Boys Basketball (A)
2014 Boys Basketball (A)
2015 Girls Basketball (A)
2016 Boys Cross Country - Single Class
2018 Girls Cross Country - Single Class
2019 Boys Basketball (A)

Wood Memorial Trojans
2007 Girls Basketball (A)

Loogootee Lions
2005 Boys Basketball  (A)
1975 Boys Basketball  (Pre-Class)
1970 Boys Basketball (Pre-Class)
2012 Girls Volleyball (A)
2007 Girls Volleyball (A)
2006 Girls Volleyball (A)
2005 Girls Volleyball (A)
2000 Girls Volleyball (A)
2021 Girls Basketball (A)
2020 Girls Volleyball (A)

Vincennes Rivet Patriots
2009 Girls Basketball (A)
2009 Boys Baseball (A)
2010 Girls Basketball (A)
2018 Girls Basketball (A)
2019 Girls Basketball (A)

Washington Catholic Cardinals
2005 Girls Basketball (A)

Former Member State Titles

Forest Park Rangers (3)
2001 Softball (A)
2005 Boys Basketball (2A)
2006 Boys Basketball (2A)

Neighboring Conferences
Pocket Athletic Conference
Patoka Lake Conference

References

External links
IHSAA Conference Membership
IHSAA State Champions
Southwest Indiana Conference Histories

 
High school sports conferences and leagues in the United States
Indiana high school athletic conferences
Southwestern Indiana
Education in Daviess County, Indiana
Education in Dubois County, Indiana
Education in Gibson County, Indiana
Education in Knox County, Indiana
Education in Martin County, Indiana